Euricania is a genus of true bugs belonging to the family Ricaniidae.

The species of this genus are found in Southeastern Asia.

Species:

Euricania aperiens 
Euricania brevicula 
Euricania camilla 
Euricania clara 
Euricania cliduchus 
Euricania concinna 
Euricania cyane 
Euricania dinon 
Euricania discigutta 
Euricania facialis 
Euricania furina 
Euricania fusconebulosa 
Euricania gloriosa 
Euricania hyalinocosta 
Euricania infesta 
Euricania laetoria 
Euricania licinia 
Euricania longa 
Euricania moneta 
Euricania morio 
Euricania ocella 
Euricania oculata 
Euricania opora 
Euricania paraclara 
Euricania pedicellata 
Euricania procilla 
Euricania progne 
Euricania sirenia 
Euricania splendida 
Euricania stellata 
Euricania sterope 
Euricania subapicalis 
Euricania tibialis 
Euricania tristicula 
Euricania xizangensis

References

Ricaniidae